The 2004 Asian Junior Women's Volleyball Championship was held in Sugathadasa Indoor Stadium, Colombo, Sri Lanka from 19 September to 26 September 2004.

Pools composition
The teams are seeded based on their final ranking at the 2002 Asian Junior Women's Volleyball Championship.

Preliminary round

Pool A

|}

|}

Pool B

|}

|}

Classification 5th–8th

Semifinals

|}

7th place

|}

5th place

|}

Final round

Semifinals

|}

3rd place

|}

Final

|}

Final standing

References
 www.jva.or.jp

A
V
V
Asian women's volleyball championships
Asian Junior